Flemington Post Office is a heritage-listed post office at 2A Wellington Street, Flemington, Victoria, Australia. It was added to the Australian Commonwealth Heritage List on 8 November 2011.

History 
Flemington's first official post office was established during the 1880s, replacing the various "non-official" post offices that had operated in the area since the 1850s. Architect J. R. Brown from the Department of Public Works prepared plans for a new post office in 1888, under the supervision of John Thomas Kelleher. The tower was detailed by architect Alexander James Macdonald, and the builder was B. Pratt. The post office was moved from its original site south of Buckland Street, Flemington, to Wellington Street in 1890 so that it was close to the developing commercial centre along Racecourse Road.

Timber public telephone booths and a cast iron pillar box were installed on the footpath opposite the main entrance  1920s. The domed side porch roof was replaced at an unknown date between 1917 and 1963 with a parapeted flat roof which involved creation of semicircular arched openings in lieu of original three-pointed arch and Moorish detail. The cast iron gates were removed from the porch as part of the work. A stamp vending machine and postal slips were installed in the northern wall of the porch. By 1963, all external stucco and bluestone detail including the tower roof had been overpainted in white; signage and insignia had been added to main tower; the windows in tower ground floor had been overpainted and the original clock faces replaced.

General alterations were made at an unknown date to internal fittings and services included overpainting of polished timber joinery, installation of a sliding timber door between the original mail and letter carriers' rooms, replacement of lights, installation of heating and fans. The skirting boards were also replaced in the former dining room (later parcel room) and vinyl flooring and carpet laid throughout. Around this time, the rear of the original counter was altered to accommodate modern equipment. The rear single-storey wing had been re-roofed with corrugated galvanised steel roofing by 1975.

In 1989-90, extensive rear additions were constructed to provide a mail room, bicycle/scooter shed, cleaner's store, post office box lobby, covered loading bay and plant enclosure. This involved demolition of the original rear verandah and pantry and subdivision of the original ground floor pantry to provide a passage to the new building. The southern half of the original dining room east wall was demolished to facilitate access to the passage. Alterations at first floor level included construction of a small kitchenette in the former sitting room and installation of staff amenities in the western half of the plan. A galvanised steel tube handrail installed at the main entrance doors and concrete topping was poured over main bluestone step. General internal refurbishment of finishes was also carried out.

Description 
Flemington Post Office is at 2A Wellington Street, corner Shields Street, Flemington, comprising the whole of Lot 15B/4/2541.

The Flemington Post Office, Wellington Street, was erected in 1888-89 by the Public Works Department (PWD). The working drawings are signed by J. R. Brown, who probably designed the building in consultation with the district architect J. T. Kelleher. The contractor was P. Pratt. The two storey brick structure with stucco mouldings is dominated by an octagonal tower with conical roof, onion dome and crescent moon finial.

The building utilises an acute-angled intersection between Wellington and Shields Street and being 50 metres from the Racecourse Road shopping centre, is complemented by William Wolf's Kennedy Terrace of 1888, a wedge-shaped housing development, in addition to the Public Works Department's own Court House and Police Station, completed several years after the Post Office.

The rear service yard occupies the broad northern portion of the triangular site and crossovers from Wellington and Shields streets provide vehicular through access. A steel-framed canopy shelters the rear loading dock directly into the non-original mail room wing which has an integral bicycle shed. The Wellington Street frontage is partly screened by an original cast iron and bluestone palisade fence, while the remaining boundary is defined by a more recent corrugated steel fence and steel gates. Elsewhere, the building is essentially constructed to the property boundary.

Flemington Post Office is a substantial two-storeyed building with corner tower which makes dramatic use of its triangular corner site and unusual Moorish detail. Brickwork is Tuckpointed and polychromatic with brown body bricks, red, white and black string courses and red dressings to openings. Cornices, parapets and windows are enriched with deeply moulded stucco work and the facetted corner tower has a facetted conical sheet metal clad roof surmounted by an onion-domed sphere and finial recalling Moorish architecture. Similar references occur in the corbel table to the main cornice and the cusped window heads.

The complex roofscape is variously composed of mansard and jerkinhead forms and clad with slate, however original cast iron cresting has been removed. The single-storey rear section is hipped and finished with recent corrugated galvanised steel.

Fenestration is regular between the long elevations and between floors, however openings are variously defined by alternative arch and tracery types according to hierarchy and each contains a timber-framed double-hung sash window.

Entrances contain panelled timber doors and the former private entrance is surrounded by matching panelled side and highlights finished with etched ruby glass. The side panels have been infilled with timber boarding.

Condition and integrity 

The slate roof and tower require very careful restoration. The cast iron palisading and finials on the roof have been removed.

Externally, Flemington Post Office's ability to demonstrate its original design is very good with regard to the architectural conception, principal materials and detail despite rear additions constructed in 1989 and replacement of the private porch roof. The design of the rear addition is low-key and it attempts not to compete with the original from a distance, however closer inspection indicates subtle difference in detail. The exterior appears generally well-maintained and conservation works in the late 1980s have generally restored the building's aesthetic and stylistic attributes.

Internally, the 1989 additions have partially diminished the legibility of the original planning and program towards the rear of the complex, however elsewhere it is generally very good. More superficial refurbishment such as overpainting of joinery and installation of floor coverings and the like is largely reversible. The main entrance, public space and former mail room, for example, are all largely intact in form and fabric with added features such as the original curved counter and arcaded screen intact.

It is apparent that the building is generally well maintained, however there is evidence in a number of instances of rising and falling damp which is starting to damage the adjoining fabric. Repairs are required to some sections of pointing mortar in the bluestone plinth and brickwork and tuckpointing needs repointing. Wall cracking is evident in the southeast corner of the post-master's office and the ceiling have been repaired.

Heritage listing 
Historically, Flemington Post Office of 1889 was the first in a series of major public buildings, including the Court House and Police Station, sited in the post-gold growth centre of Flemington. Built to replace an earlier post office operating from at least 1869, the building was sited to one side of an old gold rush trekking route. The importance of Flemington Post Office has also been recognised in a national postage stamp series of Australia's leading post offices. The post office is noted for retaining its original timber counter with cast iron colonnettes supporting arched openings, and original timber writing desks with leather inlaid writing surfaces, fitted to alcoves in the public space.

Flemington Post Office is an exceptional example of a large suburban post office with quarters. The composition is skilfully conceived taking full advantage of the awkward site to dictate the program arrangement. Its stylistic eclecticism is an extraordinary example associated with the period of public works department "Battle of the Styles". Its hybrid Victorian-Federation style is tied together by unexpected embellishment using Moorish motifs. Architecturally, Flemington is an excellent solution to an awkward site, considered to be one of the most skilful compositions by the Public Works Department architects at the time. The eastern division of the PWD, in which these architects practised, was considered the most inventive of all of the architectural sections of the Department.

Flemington Post Office also has dramatic landmark qualities deriving from its prominent position on an acute-angled site, dual approach, visibility in the round, and a five level tower. The building is a distinguished feature of the surrounding Flemington Hill Conservation Area which is characterised by a highly intact Victorian character. The highly artistic and skilful handling of an awkward triangular site demonstrates great merit and unity of conception, despite the hand of three separate designers. Flemington Post office has social significance within this inner region of Melbourne, not just for its continuity of providing postal services from the site for almost 120 years, but also due to its much valued form and architectural treatment. Flemington Post Office is additionally associated with three enduring and capable architects engaged by the Public Works Department during the late nineteenth century, JT Kelleher, AJ McDonald and JR Brown. The eastern district of the architectural section of the Department was considered to be the most inventive and produced many notable and award-winning buildings with remarkable features, of which Flemington is one of the most distinguished.

The curtilage includes the title block/allotment of the property.

The significant components of Flemington Post Office include the main postal building and corner tower of 1889-90.

References

Bibliography 
 NATIONAL TRUST OF AUSTRALIA (VICTORIA) FILE NO.2778 2. AUSTRALASIAN
 BUILDER AND CONTRACTORS NEWS 28/1/1889. 3. LA TROBE LIBRARY, STATE
 LIBRARY OF VICTORIA. MATTHEW FLINDERS MEASURED DRAWING COMPETITION
 1976. TRETHOWAN,BRUCE AND WOODBURN,JAMES. 'FLEMINGTON POST OFFICE,
 WELLINGTON STREET, FLEMINGTON'.
 GS Warmington & AC Ward, Australia Post Survey of Historic Properties in Victoria, 1990; Register of the National Trust, B2778; Register of the National Estate, ID 5230; Victorian Heritage Register, VHR H1201; City of Melbourne, Flemington and Kensington Conservation Study, Building Citations, 1985; Savills, APPD Property Valuation Report, June 2005; Conrad Hamann, Episodes in Australian Architecture, 1880-2000, general history in preparation, Part 1; Ray and John Oldham, George Temple Poole, UWA Press, Perth, 1980; Myra Orth, 'The influence of the “American Romanesque” in Australia', Journal of the Society of Architectural Historians, 32, May 1975 (for South Yarra, Euroa and contemporary post office designs in Victoria); Australian Heritage Commission, The Heritage of Australia, Macmillan, Melbourne, 1981, pp. 3/50-1 (Flemington) 2/11 (Ashfield).

Attribution 

Commonwealth Heritage List places in Victoria
Flemington, Victoria
Post office buildings in Victoria (Australia)
Articles incorporating text from the Australian Heritage Database
Heritage-listed buildings in Melbourne
Buildings and structures in the City of Moonee Valley
1890 establishments in Australia
Government buildings completed in 1890